Low-dose chemotherapy is being studied/used in the treatment of cancer to avoid the side effects of conventional chemotherapy. Historically, oncologists have used the highest possible dose that the body can tolerate in order to kill as many cancer cells as possible. After high-dose treatments, the body reacts, sometimes quite severely. Infections from external causes become a leading threat of death.

Forms of low-dose chemotherapy
The following forms of low-dose chemotherapy have been proposed. They are not always widely available treatments at hospitals.

Oral low-dose chemotherapy
Patients are given chemotherapy drugs orally very frequently. This approach can be very effective for some cancers and can minimize side effects for some people. More patients are using oral chemotherapy than ever before.

Low-dose chemotherapy and antiangiogenesis
Adam Dicker, an associate professor at Jefferson Medical College of Thomas Jefferson University in Philadelphia in the United States, has written that chemotherapy is often used in the highest possible doses. They are rethinking chemotherapy because of the antiangiogenic effects of low dose chemotherapy given on a more frequent basis than conventional chemotherapy. They have shown excellent antiangiogenic results in the laboratory.

Insulin potentiation therapy low-dose chemotherapy

Although yet to be proven, insulin potentiation therapy (IPT) proponents suggest that insulin modifies cancer cells receptivity to being penetrated by the chemotherapy. Cancer cells secrete their own insulin and insulin-like growth factor (IGF) which work together to consume the body's nutrients to grow cancer. Cancer cell membranes have about sixteen times more insulin and IGF receptors than normal cells, and these receptors react with synthetic insulin. When insulin is administered, the cancer starves for glucose and generates enzyme activity that makes the cell membrane more permeable. The chemotherapy drug gets absorbed by the cancer. By using the very same mechanisms that cancer cells use to grow and kill people, proponents believe IPT channels the chemotherapy drug directly inside the cancer cells leaving normal cells alone.

Insulin therapy is not the same as IPT low-dose chemotherapy. Insulin on its own modulates the transportation of nutrients and more throughout the body. There have been several attempts to use insulin in a variety functions that have proven ill-advised.
In biological cancer therapies, an insulin potentiation therapy can be used to administer mandelonitrile (B17) as a pre step to an IPT low-dose Chemotherapy.

Research
There are many other researchers looking for low-dose chemotherapy treatments.

Footnotes

Antineoplastic drugs
Alternative medical treatments